Yaprak Özdemiroğlu (born 14 August 1963) is a Turkish actress, and ballet dancer.

Career
Daughter of Attila Özdemiroğlu, a film score composer and arranger, Özdemiroğlu was born in Ankara, the Turkish capital. She studied ballet technique at Turkish State Conservatory. She started her career with theatre acting.

In 1981, she moved to Istanbul and started acting at local movies and TV series.

Personal life
On 9 September 2011, it has been featured on various local papers that Özdemiroğlu and  Cem Yılmaz, a prominent Turkish writer and stand-up comedian, have been seen together during the concert of Jamiroquai. Yılmaz denied the rumours.

Filmography

Movies

TV series

References

External links
 Özdemiroğlu on IMDb

1963 births
Actresses from Ankara
People from Ankara
Living people
20th-century Turkish actresses